Bernard I (or Bernardo, Bernhard) may refer to:

 Bernard of Septimania, also known as Bernard I of Toulouse (born 795)
 Bernard I of Poitiers (died 844)
 Bernard I of Armagnac (died 995), called 'the Suspicious', first duke of Armagnac
 Bernard I William of Gascony (died c. 1009)
 Bernard I, Duke of Saxony (died 1011)
 Bernard I of Bigorre, (962–1034)
 Bernard I of Berga, count of Berga in 1035–1050
 Bernard II Tumapaler of Gascony (died 1064x1090), sometimes counted as Bernard I
 Bernard I de Balliol (died 1164)
 Bernard I, Margrave of Baden-Baden (died 1431)
 Bernard I, Duke of Brunswick-Lüneburg (died 1434)
 Bernardo I of Kongo (died 1567)